College transfer is the anticipated movement students consider between education providers and the related institutional processes supporting those secondary and post-secondary learners who actually do move with completed coursework or training that may be applicable to a degree pathway and published requirements.

Overview
Student movements between different education providers spanning secondary and post-secondary institutions of higher education are varied. College transfer covers the exploratory effort, self-assessment and enrollment steps students take considering their prior learning credentials - which could include coursework grades, credit recommendations or exams reflecting their prior leaning investment and efforts. The application, applicability and articulation of prior course credits from one college or university to another culminates in a student's transfer and enrollment in a program of study, aspiring to complete a college level credential. The assessment of prior learning and the articulation of credit offered to a prospective student varies based upon institutional practices and the enforcement of government policies enacted through legislative or negotiated rules.

College transfer also describes the general institutional support services including the academic, enrollment and advising required to help steer students through the complexity of changing institutions or programs of study and to help them understand the impact on requirements for degree completion. College transfer not only spans educational providers and their academic policies, it defines the new normal for the majority of students enrolled in higher education across many countries.

Background

According to the National Center for Education Statistics (NCES), in 2005 nearly 60% of college graduates in the United States who completed undergraduate degrees had attended two or more institutions prior to graduation. In the United States, roughly 2.5 million students explore college transfer which may involve re-entry from the workforce as students stop and start along their degree pathway. Student mobility spans institutions and regions, differing policies and practices often extending college degree completion by an average of one semester according to the GAO in a report to Congress in October 2005.

Student mobility is not just in the United States. By mid-2010, 2.2 million students will have experienced what it means to do an ERASMUS term in one of more than 4,000 higher education institutions in 33 participating countries. These include all the EU Member States as well as Iceland, Liechtenstein, Norway, Turkey, Switzerland and North Macedonia. The Erasmus Programme (European Community Action Scheme for the Mobility of University Students), a.k.a. Erasmus Project is a European Union (EU) student exchange programme established in 1987. It forms a major part of the EU Lifelong Learning Programme 2007–2013, and is the operational framework for the European Commission's initiatives in higher education.

Criticism

Typically, the application deadline is March 1, and undergraduate institutions will often respond to the applicants within a few months at a time later than normal freshman college acceptances. The Common Application questions focus on the student's motivation to switch to a different university, in addition to college specific questions, rather than emphasizing high school senior's personal statements. Although this decision is incredibly important, the time between receiving acceptances and notifying the institutions of one's plans is very slim.

Notable transfers

 Barack Obama: Occidental College to Columbia University
 Tom Hanks: Chabot College to California State University, Sacramento
 George Lucas: Modesto Junior College to University of Southern California
 Charles Evans Hughes: Colgate University to Brown University
 Bradley Cooper: Villanova University to Georgetown University
 Warren Buffett: University of Pennsylvania to University of Nebraska
 Donald Trump: Fordham University to University of Pennsylvania
 John F. Kennedy: Princeton University to Harvard College
 Jimmy Carter: Georgia Institute of Technology to United States Naval Academy
 Woodrow Wilson: Davidson College to Princeton University
 Mitt Romney: Stanford University to Brigham Young University
 Bernie Sanders: Brooklyn College to University of Chicago
 Antonio Villaraigosa: East Los Angeles College to University of California, Los Angeles
 Lucy Liu: New York University to University of Michigan
 Stephen Colbert: Hampden–Sydney College to Northwestern University
 Ruth Bader Ginsburg: Harvard Law School to Columbia Law School

See also
 Transfer admissions in the United States
 NCAA transfer portal, a mechanism for facilitating transfers of student-athletes

References

Higher education
Academic transfer